Allanshaw was a 1,589 ton, iron sailing ship with a length of , beam of  and draught of . She was built by William Simons & Company of Renfrew for the J.G. Potter & Company of Liverpool and launched on 29 August 1874. She was bought by the Nourse Line on 26 November 1880. She was a fast ship, making the run from London to Sydney in 65 days. On 2 October 1882 she arrived in Australia with new immigrants.

She was primarily used for the transportation of Indian indentured labourers to the colonies. Details of some of these voyages are as follows:

On 23 March 1893 she was wrecked on Tristan da Cunha, while en route from Liverpool to Calcutta, carrying salt, with the loss of 3 lives.

See also 
Indian Indenture Ships to Fiji
Indian indenture system

References

External links 

History of Australia (1851–1900)
Shipwrecks in the Atlantic Ocean
History of Tristan da Cunha
Indian indenture ships to Fiji
Victorian-era passenger ships of the United Kingdom
Individual sailing vessels
Maritime incidents in 1893
1874 ships
Ships built on the River Clyde